Marguerite-D'Youville is a regional county municipality located in the Montérégie region of  southwestern Quebec, Canada. The seat is in Verchères.

The RCM was formerly named Lajemmerais Regional County Municipality, after Christophe du Frost de Lajemmerais, the father of Marguerite d'Youville. On February 12, 2011, the name was changed to honour d'Youville directly. However, Statistics Canada retained the name "Lajemmerais" for the 2011 census because the name change came after its reference date of January 1, 2011.

Subdivisions
There are 6 subdivisions within the RCM:

Cities & Towns (4)
 Contrecœur
 Saint-Amable
 Sainte-Julie
 Varennes

Municipalities (2)
 Calixa-Lavallée
 Verchères

Demographics

Population

Language

Transportation

Access Routes
Highways and numbered routes that run through the municipality, including external routes that start or finish at the county border:

 Autoroutes
 
 

 Principal Highways
 
 
 

 Secondary Highways
 None

 External Routes
 None

See also
 List of regional county municipalities and equivalent territories in Quebec

References

 
Census divisions of Quebec